Milton Matthews (died April 11, 1896) was an American soldier who fought in the American Civil War. Matthews received his country's highest award for bravery during combat, the Medal of Honor. Matthews's medal was won for capturing the flag of the 7th Tennessee Infantry at the Third Battle of Petersburg, Virginia. He was one of six members of the regiment to earn that award that day. He was honored with the award on May 10, 1865.
Matthews was born in Pittsburgh, where he entered the service, and died in Milwaukee.

Medal of Honor citation

See also

 List of American Civil War Medal of Honor recipients
 61st Pennsylvania Infantry Regiment
 Third Battle of Petersburg

Notes/references

Bibliography

External links
 Pennsylvania Volunteers, PA Civil War Medal of Honor Recipients, Westmoreland County

Year of birth unknown
1896 deaths
19th-century American people
American Civil War recipients of the Medal of Honor
People of Pennsylvania in the American Civil War
Military personnel from Pittsburgh
Union Army soldiers
United States Army Medal of Honor recipients
Burials in Wisconsin